The Tapuacan River, also known as Tapuakan River or Pugo River, is a river located in Barangay Cares, municipality of Pugo, La Union, Philippines. Its headwaters are situated at the Santo Tomas mountain range, with the main tributary being the Najeng River located in Barangay Tabaan Norte, Tuba, Benguet.

In 2017, the river was awarded by the Regional Development Council of the Ilocos Region as the cleanest and safest inland body of water in the entire region and in La Union province.

In Ilocano, tapuakan means "a place where one can jump as high". In the river, cool and pristine water flows from the town's streams amid a huge rockbeds or large (huge and quite flat) rock formations surrounded by forests and a waterfall.

Topography

The Pugo River is a stream (a body of running water moving to a lower level in a channel on land, class H - Hydrographic) with the region font code of Asia/Pacific.

The river has crystal clear waters flowing from the mountain top towards the river mainstream, slowing down along giant stones, engulfing into the calves of other rock formations that are tact along the water's path. Its UTM position is TU20 and its Joint Operation Graphics reference is NE51-13 (with nearby cities of San Carlos City, Alaminos & Tarlac).

Tapuacan's Qiblah direction is 288.672387 degrees from North clockwise.
Tapuacan is part of PUGAD (which means bird's nest) or Pugo Adventure (the whole Pugo landmark site known as the newly opened Ilocos picturesque adventure and recreation destination, covering more than 3 hectares of lush mountain, forests and cleanest river).

Gallery

See also
 List of rivers of the Philippines

References

External links
International River Network
International Rivers

Rivers of the Philippines
Landforms of La Union